Domașnea is a commune in Caraș-Severin County, western Romania with a population of 1,371 people. It is composed of two villages, Cănicea (Szörénykanizsa) and Domașnea.

Description

Domașnea is situated at 492 m altitude in the south-west part of Romania in Caraș-Severin county.
His total area is 64 ha having as neighbors Teregova to the north, Rusca to the northwest, Cornereva to the east, Cornea to the south, Mehadica to the southwest and Luncavița to the west. The distance between Domașnea and the county administrative center, Reșița, is 90 km. The other important cities are Caransebeș at 45 km and Băile Herculane at 25 km.

Domașnea name comes from the Latin word "domus", plus the Latin suffix [(n)ia], meaning "the place with big houses". The Slavonian "domas" is a corrupt form of the same Latin word, and has the same meaning (house, domestic).

After the great migrations period, according to a document published by the Hungarian historian Frigzes, Domașnea was mentioned for the first time  in 1436. However, some new evidence, especially those made by Dr. Dimitrie Roman, bring up to light a document which indicates the fact that a group of houses were certainly located on the border of the village from 159 BC. This document it is a military Certificate issued on the name of a Celtic soldier named Ivornecus by the Rman emperor Hadrianus, on 27 September 159 A.D. This is a bronze tablet so named "Tabula Honestae Missions", and it is now stored at the Antiquity Museum in Wien (AU) under the name D.XVII.

In 1962 Domașnea was collectivized, being the only one of this area which was forced to adopt this system.

This village saw an outbreak of the anti-communist movement from the Banat region.

References

External links
  Domaşnea web site 

Communes in Caraș-Severin County
Localities in Romanian Banat